The Hydrospace is the world's first four-stroke stand-up jet ski, or personal watercraft. It was introduced in October 2005 by Hydrospace. In 2007, Hydrospace changed their name to HSR-Benelli following the acquisition of Benelli Motori (related to, but unaffiliated with, Benelli shotguns or Benelli motorcycles).

The company originated in Pöchlarn, Austria, with sales networks worldwide. The Hydrospace is a single-passenger stand-up watercraft which was designed primarily for racing. Until 2008, the only model offered was the "Hydrospace S4", with a retail price of around US$15,000.

The S4 is powered by a two-cylinder water-cooled four-stroke engine with a displacement of 749cc, rated at 110 horsepower. The engine is equipped with a turbocharger from the factory, operating at 7.7 pounds per square inch of boost.  The engine uses 91 US octane minimum gasoline.

Although touted as being the most advanced stand-up ever manufactured, the S4 has been plagued with problems. They have, however, been resolved over the years. In 2008, the newly formed HSR-Benelli released additional models of personal watercraft, including a new runabout model.

HSR-Benelli has succeeded in winning several World Championship titles since 2006. In December, HSR-Benelli changed its name to Benelli srl, moved to Pesaro in Italy and is working on a new generation of PWCs which will be available for 2012.

The 2010 model line includes 

 S4 black and white
 Series-R Sport Edition

External links
Benelli Group

Personal water craft